Cyprinion macrostomum, also known as the kangal fish, is a ray-finned cyprinid It is native to Iran, Syria and Turkey.

References

macrostomum
Fish described in 1843
Fish of Iran
Freshwater fish of Western Asia
Cyprinid fish of Asia